Meriç Yurdatapan (born 1972) is a Turkish woman jazz singer resident in Germany. Yurdatapan came to Germany at the age of 18 to study architecture but changed to study singing at the University of Mainz. She became well known in Germany from her concert Live in Mainz, which became her first commercial record release.

Discography
Meriç Yurdatapan Oriental Jazz Live in Mainz 2007
Meriç Yurdatapan The Great Turkish Songbook

References

External links

Official Website

Turkish jazz singers
1972 births
Living people
21st-century Turkish singers
21st-century Turkish women singers